Acibenzolar-S-methyl is the ISO common name for an organic compound that is used as a fungicide. Unusually, it is not directly toxic to fungi but works by inducing systemic acquired resistance, the natural defence system of plants.

History
In the 1980s, researchers at Ciba-Geigy in Switzerland were seeking novel fungicides. They discovered that the methyl ester of 1,2,3-benzothiadiazole-7-carboxylic acid, and many other derivatives, had useful activity on fungal diseases, for example Pyricularia oryzae on rice. In subsequent studies it was shown that the compound responsible for the biological activity was the carboxylic acid itself but that for optimum activity when used commercially it was important to choose a derivative which met requirements of product safety, ease of application and appropriate physical properties for translocation in the crop. After many derivatives of the acid had been tested, the S-methyl thioester was chosen for development under the code name CGA245704. The product was launched in 1996 and is now sold by Syngenta with brand names including Bion and Actigard.

Synthesis
The first synthesis of the parent 1,2,3-benzothiadiazole-7-carboxylic acid was disclosed in patents filed by Ciba-Geigy. The heterocyclic ring of the 1,2,3-benzothiadiazole core is formed by the classic ring-closure of a thiol onto a diazonium group adjacent in its benzene ring. One example from the patent is the diazotisation reaction of 3-amino-2-benzylthiobenzoic acid methyl ester, as its hydrochloride salt, with sodium nitrite in water. This gives 7-methoxycarbonyl-1,2,3-benzothiadiazole in 86% yield after recrystallization.

Conversion of the ester into the thioester is by standard hydrolysis to form the free carboxylic acid followed by conversion of the acid to the S-methyl thioester as standard chemical transformations.

Mechanism of action
Acibenzolar-S-methyl has an unusual mechanism of action for a fungicide. It is not directly toxic to the fungus but instead activates the natural defences of the crop in a manner similar to the known role of salicylic acid and methyl jasmonate. The genes for systemic acquired resistance are induced and pathogenesis-related proteins are produced. The thioester is a propesticide for its active carboxylic acid metabolite. This hydrolysis reaction occurs in the plant, catalyzed by methyl salicylate esterase.

Usage

In the USA
Pesticides are required to seek registration from appropriate authorities in the country in which they will be used. In the United States, the Environmental Protection Agency (EPA) is responsible for regulating pesticides under the Federal Insecticide, Fungicide, and Rodenticide Act (FIFRA) and the Food Quality Protection Act (FQPA). A pesticide can only be used legally according to the directions on the label that is included at the time of the sale of the pesticide. The purpose of the label is "to provide clear directions for effective product performance while minimizing risks to human health and the environment". A label is a legally binding document that mandates how the pesticide can and must be used and failure to follow the label as written when using the pesticide is a federal offence.

Acibenzolar-S-methyl is registered in the US for use either as a seed treatment or for direct spraying on crops. Since it activates the crop's own defence mechanisms, it is not usually effective in curing established disease, only in protecting against future disease development. As a seed treatment it is registered for use on cotton, sunflower and sorghum while for spraying it is licensed on a wide range of vegetable crops. The estimated annual use of acibenzolar-S-methyl in US agriculture is mapped by the US Geological Survey and shows a growing trend from its introduction in 2000 to 2017, the latest date for which figures are available. However, the total annual use has never exceeded 8000 lb (3600 kg), which is very low for an agrochemical. As expected given the main use on fruit and vegetables, the main areas of use are in California and Florida.

In Europe
The product is also registered in Europe, where there is a monitoring programme to make sure that residues in food are below the limits set by the European Food Safety Authority. It is sometimes mixed with other pesticides to provide an extra degree of control by activating the crop's defence mechanisms in addition to the lethal effect of the main ingredient.

Human safety
However, it  can cause moderate eye irritation. First aid information is included with the label. The Codex Alimentarius database maintained by the FAO lists the maximum residue limits for acibenzolar-S-methyl and its parent acid in various food products.

Resistance management
Although fungal populations have the ability to develop resistance to fungicides, the mechanism of action of acibenzolar-S-methyl gives it an advantage over conventional pesticides owing to its lack of direct toxicity to fungi. Nevertheless, regulatory bodies such as the EPA and the Fungicides Resistance Action Committee (FRAC) monitor the risks of resistance developing: FRAC has assigned acibenzolar-S-methyl into its own class (group P01 fungicide).

References

Further reading

External links 
 

Fungicides
Benzothiadiazoles
Thioesters